Canadian Pacific 1238 is a preserved G5c class 4-6-2 "Pacific" type steam locomotive built by the Montreal Locomotive Works in 1946. It was purchased by George Hart, who used it for excursion service in the 1960s. It was later sold to Jack Showalter, who operated it on his Allegany Central Railroad from the 1970s to the mid-1990s. As of 2023, No. 1238 is stored on the Prairie Dog Central Railway under private ownership while waiting for a future restoration.

History

Revenue service 
No. 1238 was constructed in 1946 at the Montreal Locomotive Works in Montreal, Quebec as the sixth member of the Canadian Pacific Railway's (CPR) G5c class. It was initially assigned to pull passenger trains throughout Quebec and Ontario, and as the CPR dieselized their locomotive fleet, No. 1238 was reassigned to pull freight trains. It was retired from revenue service by 1959, and it sat idle for the next five years.

Early preservation 
In December 1964, No. 1238 was purchased by steam locomotive historian George M. Hart, who founded Rail Tours Incorporated to host several steam-powered excursion trains throughout the Northeastern United States. No. 1238 was moved to York, Pennsylvania, where Hart and his crews restored the locomotive back to service in 1966. From there, it began pulling excursion trains on the Maryland and Pennsylvania Railroad (MPA) between York and Baltimore, Maryland alongside Hart's other steam locomotives, including CPR G5d No. 1286, CPR 4-6-0 No. 972, and Reading 0-6-0st No. 1251. The locomotive would also pull trains on mainlines owned by nearby class 1 railroads, such as the Reading, the Western Maryland (WM), the Central Railroad of New Jersey (CNJ), and the Lehigh and Hudson River (L&HR).

In 1967, another steam locomotive preservationist, Ross E. Rowland, began loaning both No. 1238 and No. 1286 from Hart to pull his own excursion trains over the CNJ's mainline between Jersey City, New Jersey and Wilkes-Barre, Pennsylvania. In early February 1968, however, a winter storm hit the city of Reading, and the boilers of the Reading Steam Heat and Power Company had broken down, causing most of the buildings of downtown Reading to lose power and warmth. Hart had both Nos 1238 and 1286 moved from Jersey City to Reading, and then he loaned them to the city. Both locomotives were used to supply heated steam for the plant to keep the city warm, despite the amount of soot rising from their smokestacks. With both locomotives temporarily out of commission, Rowland ended up loaning CPR G5d No. 1278 from Steamtown, U.S.A. and Great Western 2-10-0 No. 90 from the Strasburg Rail Road to pull the doubleheaded excursion trains he had hosted that same month.

After the plant's boilers were repaired and became fully operational, Nos 1238 and 1286 vacated Reading on February 7. In August 1968, without much sentiment to keep his G5 locomotives any longer, Hart sold Nos 1238 and 1286 to the Historic Red Clay Valley Railway Equipment and Leasing Company, which had leased them to Rowland, so that he would use both locomotives to pull his excursion trains more often.

On May 18, 1969, No. 1238 pulled a doubleheaded twenty-car excursion train with No. 1286 over Penn Central trackage from Union Station in Baltimore over the Port Deposit Branch and the Columbia Branch to the Transportation Center in Harrisburg, Pennsylvania on behalf of the Baltimore Chapter of the National Railway Historical Society (NRHS). However, that trip was plagued with various mechanical issues, and both locomotives were in control of Penn Central employees. Along the Port Deposit branch, No. 1238 threw out one of its piston packings, causing its running gear to be disabled, while No. 1286 began losing steam due to firebox issues, and these factors caused the excursion to arrive in Harrisburg later than anticipated. After a photo session took place at the Harrisburg station, Nos 1238 and 1286 were returned to Baltimore over the former Northern Central line after dawn with a Penn Central diesel locomotive coupled in front as a precaution. Both G5s were subsequently repaired in Baltimore, and they subsequently appeared on Rowland's excursion trains less and less often. By 1973, Rowland was no longer using No. 1238 for excursion service.

Jack Showalter ownership 
In 1973, No. 1238 was sold along with No. 1286 to Jack Showalter, who moved it to Covington, Virginia for an extensive overhaul. Showalter founded the Alleghany Central tourist railroad (ACRR) along with his family, and it originally lied over the Chesapeake and Ohio Railway's (C&O) fifteen-mile Hot Springs branch between Covington and Intervale. No. 1238 was returned to service in 1975, and it began pulling tourist trains between Covington and Hot Springs at fifteen miles per hour along a tributary of the James River. Throughout June 1981, No. 1238 was loaned to the Southern Railway to fill in for their own steam locomotives, which were all out of service at the time. The locomotive pulled four excursion trains for the Southern in and out of Alexandria, Virginia for three weekends during that month. In October 1983, the USF&G Insurance company hired the ACRR to provide an excursion train for their patrons. No. 1238 pulled the train on the Chessie System's mainline from Covington to Clifton Forge, Virginia, and then through the Allegheny Mountains to the Greenbrier Resort in White Sulphur Springs, West Virginia. After the 1984 operating season, however, rising insurance costs and ownership disputes forced the ACRR to vacate Covington, and the Hot Springs branch was ripped up with the rails being sold for scrap.

In 1988, Showalter made a deal with the Scenic Railroad Development Corporation (SRDC) to run his trains on their newly restored trackage, which was formerly used by the WM and the Cumberland and Pennsylvania Railroad between Cumberland and Frostburg, Maryland. The ACRR subsequently changed their name to the Allegany Central Railroad, and after their equipment was moved to Ridgeley, West Virginia, No. 1238 began service for the line in the spring of 1989, with No. 1286 being brought back the following year. This operation didn't last long, however, since in February 1991, the contract that allowed Showalter to operate on the SRDC's trackage was close to expiring, and disputes prevented him from renewing it. The ACRR operated their last train between Cumberland and Frostburg on December 8, 1990, before the SRDC changed their name to the Western Maryland Scenic Railroad to operate their own trains with their own locomotives, such as Lake Superior and Ishpeming 2-8-0 No. 34, and eventually, C&O 2-6-6-2 No. 1309.

By the beginning of 1992, Showalter moved his equipment to Gordonsville, Virginia for storage while he was searching for another tourist line to operate his trains on. During this time, the ACRR's name was changed again to the Virginia Central Railroad (VCRR). On October 23, 1993, No. 1238 performed a tripleheader with No. 1286 and EMD gp9 No. 40 to pull the VCRR's rolling stock over the CSX mainline to Staunton. On October 30, Showalter used both G5s to pull one doubleheaded excursion train on the mainline between Charlottesville and Clifton Forge, as well as a train on October 31 between Charlottesville and Gordonsville. In the beginning of November, CSX raised the insurance costs for Showalter to run his trains on their mainline, and without the ability to afford such a high price, Showalter ceased mainline operations for the VCRR. No. 1238 was subsequently stored on the Shenandoah Valley Railroad (SVRR) while Showalter began searching for another railroad to run his trains on. Beginning in 2004, No. 1238 was being stored in Verona with tarps covering it for protection from the weather. Showalter had passed away in November 2014.

Disposition 
In 2015, No. 1238 was sold off to a private owner from Alberta as part of a liquidation sale. In July of that year, No. 1238 was lifted onto a flatcar with its tender being placed on another along with No. 1286's tender, and the locomotive began its journey to Manitoba in early August. On September 13, No. 1238 arrived on the Prairie Dog Central Railway in Winnipeg, and after it was lifted off of the flatcars, it touched Canadian soil for the first time since it was moved to Pennsylvania back in 1965. As of 2023, No. 1238, is still in storage in Winnipeg under private ownership, and there are no confirmed plans to bring the locomotive back to service.

Film history 

 During June 1981, while it was still on loan to the Southern Railway, No. 1238 was also used in Montpelier Station (depicting Greenwood), Virginia during filming of the BBC mini series Nancy Astor, which chronicled the life of Nancy Astor, and it starred Lisa Harrow, Lise Hilboldt, and Pierce Brosnan. During this time, No. 1238 was relettered to Chesapeake and Ohio, and it was fitted with a vintage wooden cowcatcher.

Surviving sister engines 

 No. 1201 is currently on static display inside the Canada Science and Technology Museum in Ottawa, Ontario in Canada.
 No. 1246 is currently in storage at the Railroad Museum of New England in Thomaston, Connecticut in the United States.
 No. 1278 is currently on static display at the Age of Steam Roundhouse in Sugarcreek, Ohio in the United States.
 No. 1286 is currently with No. 1238 in storage at the Prairie Dog Central Railway in Winnipeg, Manitoba in Canada.
 No. 1293 is currently on display at the Age of Steam Roundhouse in Sugarcreek, Ohio in the United States, waiting for a rebuild.

References 

MLW locomotives
4-6-2 locomotives
1238
Individual locomotives of Canada
Preserved steam locomotives of Canada
Railway locomotives introduced in 1946
Standard gauge locomotives of Canada